Studies in Religion/ is a quarterly peer-reviewed academic journal that publishes papers in English and French in the field of theology. The editors-in-chief are Alain Bouchard and Patricia Dold (Memorial University of Newfoundland). It was established 1971 and is currently published by SAGE Publications on behalf of the Canadian Corporation for Studies in Religion.

Abstracting and indexing 
Studies in Religion / Sciences Religieuses is abstracted and indexed in:
 Arts and Humanities Citation Index
 Current Contents/Arts & Humanities
 International Review of Biblical Studies
 Religious and Theological Abstracts
 Theology Digest

External links 
 
 Canadian Corporation for Studies in Religion

SAGE Publishing academic journals
Religious studies journals
Multilingual journals
Quarterly journals
Publications established in 1955